Plesac is a surname. Notable people with the surname include:

 Dan Plesac (born 1962), American baseball player
 Zach Plesac (born 1995), American baseball player, nephew of Dan